Kolaksar (also Romanized as Kolāksar) is a village in Pain Khiyaban-e Litkuh Rural District, in the Central District of Amol County, Mazandaran Province, Iran. At the 2006 census, its population was 4,914, in 1,344 families.

References 

Populated places in Amol County